= Thomas Frederick Salter =

English angler

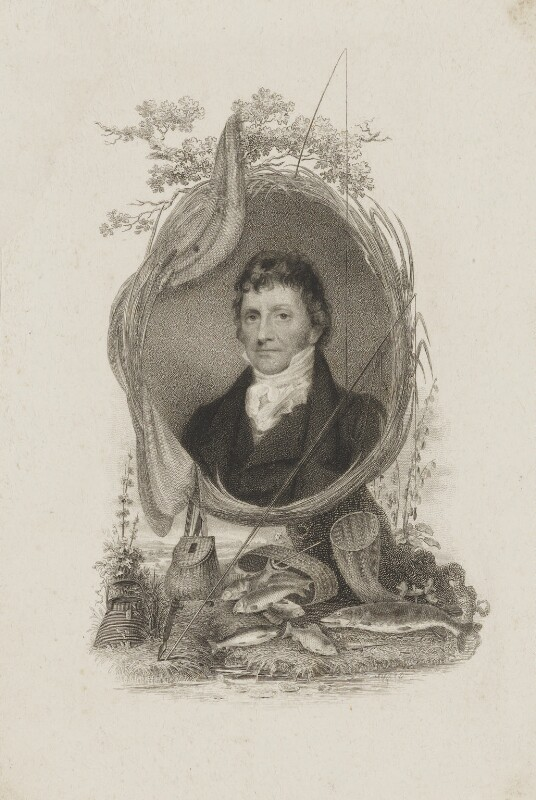
- Occupation: Angler

Thomas Frederick Salter (fl. 1814–1826) was an English writer on angling.

== Biography ==
Salter carried on business as a hatter at 47 Charing Cross, London. When a child of twelve he constantly accompanied his father on fishing expeditions, and until the age of fifty-two he used to fish wherever possible in the vicinity of London, remaining at favourite stations for weeks together. When, owing to declining health, he retired from business, he lived for a long time at Clapton Place, and put into writing his observations on angling. He called himself ‘gent.’ in the title of his first book, ‘The Angler's Guide, or Complete London Angler in the Thames, Lea, and other Waters twenty miles round London’ (1814), and dedicated it to the Duchess of York. He added a weather table, in which he assigns meteorological changes to the influence of the moon. A ninth edition was published in 1841. As of the late 19th century this was still one of the soundest and most practical treatises on the art of angling. A few copies of the sixth edition were printed on large paper with proof impressions of the plates. Salter also published: ‘The Angler's Guide Abridged,’ 1816, which passed through nine editions, and ‘The Troller's Guide,’ 1820 (3rd edit. 1841); this was also appended to the fifth edition of the ‘Angler's Guide.’
